Tatyana Petrenko-Samusenko (2 November 1938 – 24 January 2000) was a Soviet fencer. She won gold medals in the team foil event at the 1960, 1968 and 1972 Summer Olympics.

In 1962 Petrenko-Samusenko received a degree in engineering from a technical university in Minsk. In retirement she worked as a fencing coach. She was awarded the Order of the Badge of Honour, Medal "For Distinguished Labour" and Medal "For Labour Valour".

In March 1996, while her flat was being robbed, Petrenko-Samusenko jumped from a second-floor balcony. A rough landing resulted in multiple fractures in her spine and legs. She never recovered, and died in January 2000.

References

1938 births
2000 deaths
Belarusian female foil fencers
Soviet female foil fencers
Olympic fencers of the Soviet Union
Fencers at the 1960 Summer Olympics
Fencers at the 1964 Summer Olympics
Fencers at the 1968 Summer Olympics
Fencers at the 1972 Summer Olympics
Olympic gold medalists for the Soviet Union
Olympic silver medalists for the Soviet Union
Olympic medalists in fencing
Sportspeople from Minsk
Medalists at the 1960 Summer Olympics
Medalists at the 1964 Summer Olympics
Medalists at the 1968 Summer Olympics
Medalists at the 1972 Summer Olympics